The Middleweight competition was the fourth-highest weight class featured  at the 2009 World Amateur Boxing Championships, and was held at the Mediolanum Forum. Middleweights allowed in the competition were limited to a maximum of 75 kilograms in body mass.

Medalists

Seeds

  Vijender Singh  (semifinals)
  Alfonso Blanco (semifinals)
  Victor Cotiujanschii (quarterfinals)
  Abbos Atoev  (champion)
  Rey Recio  (third round)
  Zhang Jianting  (quarterfinals)
  Sergiy Derevyanchenko  (quarterfinals)
  Andranik Hakobyan (final)

Draw

Finals

Top Half

Section 1

Section 2

Bottom Half

Section 3

Section 4

See also
Boxing at the 2008 Summer Olympics – Middleweight

External links
Draw

Middleweight